The Departure of the Second Contingent for the Boer War was a 1900 New Zealand documentary film.

This is the oldest surviving New Zealand film and was produced by Alfred Henry Whitehouse.

The earliest New Zealand films being from the first of December 1898, the opening of the Auckland Industrial and Mining Exhibition, and Boxing Day that year, Uhlan winning the Auckland Cup at Ellerslie Racecourse.

References

External links

1900s New Zealand films
1900 films
1900s short documentary films
1900 in New Zealand
Black-and-white documentary films
Films set in New Zealand
New Zealand short documentary films
New Zealand silent short films